The Seattle Vocational Institute is a constituent institution of Seattle Central College, a public community college in Seattle, Washington. It was founded as the Washington Institute of Applied Technology in 1987 and took its present name in 1991. It is located in the Central District.

Academics
Seattle Vocational Institute’s instructional programs are structured into five major divisions, each with its own recognized certifications: Basic and Transitional Studies, Allied Health, Business Computers, Cosmetology, and Pre-Apprenticeship Construction Training.

Basic and Transitional Studies 
SVI also offers Adult Basic Education, GED preparation, English for non-native speakers, Adult Basic Education courses to improve reading, writing, grammar and math skills, and programs geared for high school students, including Bright Future which is the running start program at SVI.

Allied Health 
SVI's Allied Health programs include Dental Assistant, Medical Assistant, Medical Administrative Assistant and Phlebotomy

Business Computers 
SVI's Business Computer program currently offers a certificate in Computer Support Technician, and has offered certificated programs in Administrative Office Professional and Foundation: Office Clerk.

Student demographics
As an open-access institution, SVI admits all persons, provided they are 18 years of age or older. If under 18, prospective students must have graduated from high school, or submit proof of GED completion if they are 16 or 17 years old. High school students without a diploma can take classes at SVI in the Bright Future program.

Accreditation
The Seattle Colleges District comprises public state-supported institutions, individually accredited by the Northwest Commission on Colleges and Universities.  This is an institutional accrediting body recognized by the Council for Higher Education Accreditation and the United States Department of Education. Seattle Vocational Institute is accredited jointly with Seattle Central College.

Additionally, the following programs are accredited individually (year denotes first accreditation):
 Dental Assistant (2002) – Commission on Dental Accreditation of the American Dental Association 
 Medical Assistant – Commission on Accreditation of Allied Health Education Programs

References

External links
Official website

Universities and colleges in Seattle
Educational institutions established in 1987
Vocational education in the United States
1987 establishments in Washington (state)